Westerly may refer to:

 Westerlies, the prevailing winds in the middle latitudes

Places in the United States
 Westerly, Rhode Island, a town
 Westerly (CDP), Rhode Island, the urban center of the town of Westerly
 Westerly (Amtrak station), a train station
 Westerly, West Virginia, an unincorporated community
 Westerly (Piffard, New York), a historic home in Livingston County
 The Westerly, a high-rise building in Portland, Oregon

Other uses
 Westerly (magazine), a literary magazine from the University of Western Australia

See also

 Westerleigh (disambiguation)
 
 
 Wester (disambiguation)
 West (disambiguation)